Vesle Galdhøpiggen or Veslpiggen is a mountain in Lom Municipality in Innlandet county, Norway. It is the sixth highest mountain in Norway. The mountain is surrounded by several other notable mountains including Galdhøpiggen (Norway's tallest mountain) and Keilhaus topp to the southeast; Storjuvtinden, Svellnosbreahesten, and Store Tverråtinden to the south; Skardstinden to the southwest; Storgrovtinden to the west; and Storgrovhøe to the northwest.

Name
The word vesle means 'small' or 'little' - thus the name means 'the little Galdhøpiggen'.

See also
List of mountains of Norway by height

References

Jotunheimen
Lom, Norway
Mountains of Innlandet